William Dunlop Brackenridge (1810–1893) was a British-American nurseryman and botanist.

Brackenridge emigrated to Philadelphia in 1837, where he was employed by Robert Buist, nurseryman. He was appointed horticulturalist, then assistant botanist, for the United States Exploring Expedition from 1838-1842. Originally, the well-known botanist Asa Gray was to be the chief botanist, and William Rich, a Washington, DC socialite and son of an ambassador, was politically appointed as his assistant. However, Gray never went on the expedition due to taking an academic job, and Rich was appointed botanist, so they needed a new assistant.  Rich was reportedly of little use on the trip, and Brackenridge did almost all the collecting and serious botany work.

Brackenridge was assigned to the U.S. Ship Vincennes. In 1839, he collected plants in the Sydney and Hunter River districts of New South Wales, Australia. From 1841-1842, the ships explored the Oregon and California coasts, with trips inland. After returning, he continued working with the collected plants and wrote the fern report for the expedition, included in the overall botanical report written by Asa Gray. After 1855, he lived in Baltimore and worked as a nurseryman and landscape architect. Near Mount Shasta, he discovered the California Pitcher Plant, Darlingtonia californica, one of the noted successes of the expedition. John Torrey chose the genus name to honor his friend, Pennsylvania botanist William Darlington.

Brackenridge Passage in Puget Sound is named for him.

Reports of the day indicate that Brackenridge was a hardy, strapping six-footer. He and his wife Isobel were Presbyterians. They had at least four children: Agnes (1846), Robert Buist (1847), William D. (1850), and Jane Henderson Brackenridge (1854).

Plants named for W. D. Brackenridge 
The plant genus Brackenridgea A. Gray, in the Ochnaceae (Fiji and Australia)
The tree fern Cyathea brackenridgei Mett. (Cyatheaceae)

Plants named by W. D. Brackenridge 
(list not inclusive)
Diclidopteris Brack. (genus)
Diellia Brack. (genus; now included in Asplenium L.)
Onychium densum Brack.: now Aspidotis densa (Brack.) Lellinger
Antrophyum subfalcatum Brack.
Cyrtogonium palustre Brack.: now Bolbitis palustris (Brack.) Hennipman
Sitolobium samoense Brack.: now Dennstaedtia samoensis ( Brack.) T.Moore
Gymnogramma pilosa Brack.:  now Coniogramme pilosa (Brack.) Hieron.
Blechnum coriaceum (Brack.) Brownlie
Blechnum vittatum Brack.
Polypodium sarmentosum Brack.: now Adenophorus sarmentosus ( Brack. ) K.Wilson
Goniopteris costata Brack.: now Pneumatopteris costata (Brack.) Holtt.
Lastrea attenuata Brack.: now Plesioneuron attenuatum (Brack.) Holtt.
Goniopteris glandulifera Brack.: now Pneumatopteris glandulifera (Brack.) Holtt.
Elaphoglossum intermedium Brack.
Oleandra hirta Brack.

Works by W. D. Brackenridge 
Brackenridge, William Dunlop. United States Exploring Edition Report, Volume XVI - Botany - Filices. 1854.
Brackenridge, William Dunlop. United States Exploring Edition Report, Volume XVI - Botany - Filices: Atlas. 1856.

See also
 European and American voyages of scientific exploration

References 

Engraving of W. D. Brackenridge: Frontispiece, The Gardener’s Monthly and Horticulturist: Devoted to Horticulture, Agriculture and Rural Affairs, 26:312. December 1884.
William Dunlop Brackenridge Papers, circa 1838-1875 in Smithsonian Institution Archives:
Bornholdt, Mariana D. "Botanizing Western Oregon In 1841 – The Wilkes Inland Expedition": 
Journal of William Dunlop Brackenridge for October, 1841: California Historical Society Quarterly, 24(4):326-336. December, 1945.

External links

 

19th-century British botanists
Scottish botanists
Pteridologists
1893 deaths
1810 births
American horticulturists
Scottish horticulturists
People of the United States Exploring Expedition
People from Ayr
Scottish emigrants to the United States
Scottish Presbyterians
19th-century American botanists
19th-century Scottish scientists